Jackson Square may refer to:
 Jackson Square (New Orleans), public square in Louisiana, U.S.
 Jackson Square, San Francisco, neighborhood in California, U.S.
 Jackson Square, district of Boston's Jamaica Plain neighborhood in Massachusetts, U.S.
 Jackson Square station, public transit station
 Jackson Square Park (Manhattan), in New York, U.S.
 Lloyd D. Jackson Square, commercial complex in Ontario, Canada
 Jackson Square (album), 2008 music album by Arkells
 Jackson Square (Salt Lake City), Utah